Ruborridion is a monotypic genus of Asian comb-footed spiders containing the single species, Ruborridion musivum. The species was first described under the name Theridion musivum in 1873. The genus was described by J. Wunderlich in 2011. They are found in India and in the mediterranean area (southern Europe, north Africa)

See also
 List of Theridiidae species

References

Further reading

Monotypic Araneomorphae genera
Spiders of Africa
Spiders of the Indian subcontinent
Theridiidae